Jágónak is a village in Tolna county, Hungary.	

Populated places in Tolna County